William Rowley (1585?–1626) was an English Jacobean dramatist.
William Rowley (Royal Navy officer) (1690–1768), Admiral of the Fleet in the British Royal Navy; Member of Parliament for Portsmouth
William R. Rowley (1824-1886), aide-de-camp to Ulysses S. Grant; fought in the battles of Shiloh and Vicksburg; appointed Lieutenant Colonel and Military Secretary on General Grant’s Staff. 
Sir William Rowley, 2nd Baronet, British Member of Parliament for Suffolk
William Rowley (Kinsale MP), Member of Parliament for Kinsale

See also
William Rolley (1839-1912), British trade unionist and political activist